The Washington Irish Rugby Football Club is a Mid-Atlantic Conference (MAC) rugby union team based in Washington, DC. The Washington Irish currently field two competitive men's club rugby sides, one in Division I and one in Division III.  The Washington Irish compete within the Capital Geographic Union of USA Rugby.

In 2017, the Washington Irish defeated Philadelphia Whitemarsh to win the MAC Division II Championship.

History

Founding
In the Fall of 1979, several members of the American University Rugby Football Club realized — after a match against the Richmond Area Touring Side (the RATS) — that a new D.C. rugby club independent of the university would attract additional players and improve competitive rugby in the mid-Atlantic region.

John Adams, Jeff Shumaker, Tom Guidiotti (Dr. Doom), and Jerry Cave called friends and fellow players with the idea. In coordination with Bob Kimmitt, Jay Kimmitt, Pat Martell, Don Cotchen, Greg Merrill, Herb Berst, Mike McGowan, AB Behnia, John Braun, Jim Borrell, John Fiore, Eric Edgington, Steve Gannon, Randy Bryant, Jack McCarthy, Jim McVey, Keith Bonner and others, the new club was formed.  Roger Chaufournier, Rick Devens, and Tim Harrington would be quick to follow.

The initial recruiting went beyond American University and was tremendously successful, with recruits arriving through word of mouth and advertisements in The Washington Post. The team developed an unofficial clubhouse at the Irish Times bar and benefited from the presence of many military personnel in the Washington, D.C., area.

Pat Martell missed one of the meetings and was elected as the first president. John Adams pushed through the annual promotion/relegation scheme since the team was entered into Division 3 and very much wanted to move up to the first division.  Of course, the team did very well and won the challenges for two straight years and made it to Division 1 in short time. The team held its first practice in January 1980 at the Lincoln Memorial in the snow.

The first match was in March 1980 on the Washington Mall in front of the Lincoln Memorial against the team that started it all – the Richmond Area Touring Side.  The Irish won that match 16-0, with Johnny Mulligan scoring three penalties and being the man-of-the-match. The club's first major rugby triumph was the Hudepohl Classic rugby tournament at the end of summer in 1980.  Sixteen players completed five matches over two days, making it to the finals.

In 1982, the club started the Washington Irish St. Patrick’s Day Tournament.  Eight teams played on the Washington Monument grounds and the winner of that first tournament was Richmond's James River RFC.  Mike Scully actually cooked the Saturday night dinner the club served to the visiting team at the American Legion Hall on Capitol Hill, and John Mulligan did the program which included letters of welcome from President Ronald Reagan and Speaker of the House Tip O’Neill.  Bill Hardy took it over several years later, followed by Ed Reesman, and turned it into what had become one of the most profitable rugby enterprises in the U.S.

The John Braun “Spirit Award” was instituted in 1983, to honor the player who contributed in many ways, but who didn't make it as a “most valuable” in any one way – always there, always eager, always dependable, always could be counted on to make stuff happen, and was a well-respected member of the organization.

In 1988 the club won the Potomac Rugby Union Division II title by posting a 5–0 record.

1990s–present
In 2015, the Washington Irish formed a new developmental side in Division 3 of the Mid-Atlantic Conference.  The Division 3 side has a competitive schedule against teams in Washington DC, Virginia, Maryland, and Pennsylvania, and functions to introduce the game to newer players and prepare them for the next level.

In 2017, after winning the MAC championship and reaching the national USA Rugby Club D2 Round of Eight, the Washington Irish's D2 side was promoted to Division 1.  Starting in the fall of 2017, the Irish compete in USA Rugby Men's Club Division 1 against the Norfolk Blues, Pittsburgh Harlequins, Potomac Athletic Club RFC, Baltimore-Chesapeake Brumbies, Rocky Gorge RFC and others.

Crest
The club patch, a mixture of the DC flag and the Irish Shamrock, was developed by John Adams, who had previously worked with the fixtures secretary for the London Irish RFC at Hallam Street in London. John got a ton of pointers and all the London Irish’s “booklets” and such, on how to set up a great club.  They met at The Rugby Club in Hallam Street in London.  John was shown the London Irish patch — a combination of the London City flag and the Irish Shamrock.  It was a no-brainer to design the WIRFC patch on the same exact idea.  Area rugby supplier Matt Godek got behind the designing of the patch since the Irish were the first club in many years to design a new patch in the PRU.

Hall of Fame
Since 2009, the Irish have inducted former players who exemplify what it means to be a part of the Washington Irish family into the club's Hall of Fame, called the "Irish Classics."

2009
	Jerry Cave
	Don Cotchen
	Murray “Muzz” Wilton Jones
	James “Merk” Merlinger

2010
	John “Solly” Soloman
	Pat Martell
	Greg Hair

2011
	Tom Rege
	Jack "Jick" Way
	Tom "Dr. Doom" Guidiotti

2012
	Roger Chaufournier
	Jeff McEvoy
	Chuck Goldston

2013
	John France
	Eric “Casper” O’Neill
	Damian Maguire

2014
	Ed “Cheese” Reesman
	Steve “Duma” Johnson
	Dave “Scootch” Stirk

2015
	Bob Kimmitt
	Pete McGrath
	Sean Reilly

2016
       Michael "Mac" McGowan
       "Sweet" Pete McGrath
       Tom Rege

2017
       Brian Collins
       Richard Devens
       Rich Popper

References

External links
 Official Site
 USA Rugby
 MAC
 Canterbury
 Oak Grove Technologies

Rugby union teams in Washington, D.C.
Irish-American culture in sports
Irish-American culture in Washington, D.C.